Reed N. Wilcox is the current president of Southern Virginia University, where he has served since 2014.

Previously, Wilcox was involved in the pharmaceuticals industry. He has consulted in many places throughout the US, and has also at times lived abroad in China, Japan, France and Ghana. Furthermore, he served as the president of the Toulouse Mission for the Church of Jesus Christ of Latter-day Saints.

Wilcox has a bachelor's degree from Brigham Young University and a JD/MBA from Harvard University.

Wilcox also previously ran a company called the Lifelike Toy Company, based near Denver, Colorado, with Mitt Romney on the board.

References

External links
Bloomberg.com profile on Wilcox

Southern Virginia University profile

Living people
Southern Virginia University people
American Latter Day Saints
Mission presidents (LDS Church)
American expatriates in France
American expatriates in Japan
American expatriates in China
American expatriates in Ghana
Heads of universities and colleges in the United States
Harvard Business School alumni
Harvard Law School alumni
Brigham Young University alumni
Year of birth missing (living people)